Shiny Doshi (born 15 September 1989) is an Indian actress who primarily works in Hindi television. She made her acting debut with Saraswatichandra in 2013, portraying Kusum Desai. Doshi is best known for her portrayal of Sarojini Singh in Sarojini - Ek Nayi Pehal, Mahi Sengupta in Jamai Raja and Dhara Pandya in Pandya Store.

Doshi participated in Fear Factor: Khatron Ke Khiladi 8 in 2017 and made her web debut with Ratri Ke Yatri in 2020. She has an Indian Telly Award and a Gold Award nominations to her credit. Doshi is married to Lavesh Khairajani.

Early life
Doshi was born on 15 September 1989 in Ahmedabad, Gujarat into a Gujarati family. She studied fashion designing in Ahmedabad and later took up modelling.

Personal life
Doshi's father suffered a heart attack while he was on Amarnath Yatra in Jammu and Kashmir and died on 12 July 2019.

Doshi got engaged to her boyfriend Lavesh Khairajani on 4 January 2020. She married Khairajani on 15 July 2021. They married at their home in Mumbai.

Career

Modelling career

In 2011, Doshi started her career as a model. She has walked ramp and had been part of various TVCs. Her most known TVC was for a soap with actor Saif Ali Khan, that brought her into limelight.

Debut and breakthrough (2013-2017)
Doshi made her acting debut with Sanjay Leela Bhansali's Saraswatichandra. She signed it in 2011.

She portrayed Kusum Desai Vyas opposite Varun Kapoor from 2013 to 2014. She received Indian Telly Award for Fresh New Face - Female nomination for her performance. 

From 2015 to 2016, she portrayed Sarojini Somendra Singh in Sarojini - Ek Nayi Pehal opposite Mohit Sehgal and Aamir Ali. Her performance gained her Gold Award for Debut in a Lead Role (Female) nomination.

In 2016, she portrayed Samaira Ghosh opposite Karan Grover in Bahu Hamari Rajni Kant.

From 2016 to 2017, she portrayed Mahi Sengupta Khurrana in the third season of Jamai Raja, opposite Ravi Dubey. It proved as a major turning point in her career. 

Doshi participated in Fear Factor: Khatron Ke Khiladi 8 in 2017. She ended up at 11th place. 

In 2018, she portrayed Khushi opposite Neil Bhatt in Laal Ishq.
She did cameo in Dil Hi Toh Hai Season 1, opposite Karan Kundra, Episode 15 & 16 on Alt Balaji.
She participated in Box Cricket League (BCL) Season 3 as contestant of Mumbai Tigers.

Recent work and success (2019-present)
From 2019 to 2020, Doshi portrayed Radha opposite Rajneesh Duggal in the finite series Shrimad Bhagwat Mahapuran.

She portrayed Sultana Sehar and other characters such as Marjinaa, Safina, Princess Nilofar, Princess Faria, Sultana Juhi and Yasmine in Alif Laila, opposite Ankit Arora in 2020.

That year, she made her web debut with Ratri Ke Yatri opposite Parag Tyagi. She portrayed Kavita in the third episode of the anthology.

Doshi received further praises and wider recognition with her portrayal of Dhara Patel Pandya in Pandya Store, opposite Kinshuk Mahajan. She is seen portraying Dhara Patel Pandya since January 2021. 
She hosted a StarPlus show Navratri - Ek Adbhoot Utsav. 

In 2022, she reprised Dhara Pandya in the game show Ravivaar With Star Parivaar.

Filmography

Television

Special appearances

Web series

Accolades

See also
List of Indian television actresses
List of Hindi television actresses

References

External links
 
 

Living people
Fear Factor: Khatron Ke Khiladi participants
Bigg Boss contestants
1989 births